Sandy Ryan (born 16 September 1993 in Derby) is an English professional boxer.

On her senior championship debut in 2014, she won a World Championship silver medal.

In 2019 Ryan was selected to compete at the World Championships in Ulan-Ude, Russia, where she lost by split decision (4:1) to Christina Desmond in the round of 32.

In 2021 it was confirmed that Ryan has agreed terms to turn professional with Matchroom Sport.

Professional boxing record

References

External links
 
 

1993 births
Living people
English women boxers
Boxers from Derby
Commonwealth Games medallists in boxing
Commonwealth Games gold medallists for England
Boxers at the 2018 Commonwealth Games
Boxers at the 2015 European Games
European Games medalists in boxing
European Games gold medalists for Great Britain
AIBA Women's World Boxing Championships medalists
Welterweight boxers
Medallists at the 2018 Commonwealth Games